Island Council elections were held in Sint Eustatius on 21 October 2020. Sint Eustatius is a special municipality (officially "public body") of the Netherlands. The elections were originally to be held on 20 March 2019, but were postponed due to administrative intervention by the Dutch government.  On 23 September 2019, a new election date was announced.

Since 2015, foreign nationals also have the right to vote and to stand as a candidate if they are 18 years of age, reside lawfully on Bonaire, Sint Eustatius or Saba on the day of nomination, and have been a resident of the Netherlands or legally resided there immediately prior to that day for an uninterrupted period of at least five years.

The Progressive Labour Party, led by Rechelline Leerdam, won three seats on Island Council to form the governing majority, while the Democratic Party, led by Adelka Spanner, won the remaining two seats. The new Island Council members were inaugurated on 29 October.

Schedule
The timetable for these elections is as follows:

Contesting parties

Incumbent legislature
In the 2015 elections, the Progressive Labour Party and Democratic Party won two seats each, with the United People's Coalition taking one seat. Turnout was 65.46%, with 1,594 out of 2,135 eligible voters taking part. There were 6 blank ballots and 8 invalid ballots. The incumbent coalition was between the PLP and UPC.

Results

References

2020 in Sint Eustatius
Sint Eustatius
Elections in Sint Eustatius
October 2020 events in North America